Trails & Rails is a program of the National Park Service offered in conjunction with Amtrak to provide National Park Service Ranger Guides and Volunteers-In-Parks (VIPs) on segments of selected routes across the country to provide interpretive program on the history, location, and biology and ecology of the area the train route covers. The program's goal is to "reach out to people who may not traditionally visit National Park Service areas" former NPS Director Robert Stanton said.

Routes 
Trails & Rails programs are offered on segments of select Amtrak routes nationwide, led by host parks across the country. This list is of the 2020 routes, offered each week during the summer.

 Adirondack - New York City's Penn Station to Albany-Rensselaer on the northbound morning run no. 69, and from Albany-Rensselaer to Penn Station on Empire Service train no. 284 on Saturdays. 
 Ran by the National Parks of New York Harbor.
Roosevelt - Vanderbilt National Historic Sites staff join Amtrak No. 69 and No. 284 from Croton-Harmon to Hudson, NY and Hudson, NY to Croton-Harmon, respectively, on Saturdays and independently on Sundays.
Adirondack trains are also served Saturdays and Sundays from Saratoga Springs, NY to Westport, NY aboard Amtrak No. 69 as well as the southbound run, Adirondack No. 68 between Westport, NY and Saratoga Springs.
Ran by Saratoga National Historical Park staff. 
Blue Water - Amtrak No. 365 between Chicago, IL and Niles, MI hosts NPS staff Wednesdays and Sundays, and the last Tuesday of every month.
Ran by staff from Indiana Dunes National Park.
Capitol Limited - Cumberland, MD to Washington, DC on the morning run, Amtrak No. 30, and Washington, DC to Cumberland, MD on Amtrak No. 29 host NPS staff on Saturdays
Ran by the Martin Luther King, Jr. National Historical Park staff.
Crescent - Atlanta, GA to Birmingham, AL aboard Amtrak No. 19 and Birmingham, AL to Atlanta, GA aboard Amtrak No. 20 host NPS staff on Tuesdays and Saturdays.
 Ran by staff from Chesapeake and Ohio Canal National Park.
 Coast Starlight (Washington) - Amtrak No. 11 from Seattle, WA to Portland, OR and Amtrak No. 14 from Portland, OR to Seattle, WA hosts NPS staff daily.
 Ran by Klondike Gold Rush National Historical Park staff.
 Coast Starlight (California) - Amtrak No. 14 between San Jose, CA and Santa Barbra, CA and Amtrak No. 11 from Santa Barbra, CA to San Juan, CA hosts NPS staff Saturdays and Sundays.
 Ran by staff from Juan Bautista de Anza National Historical Trail.
 Empire Builder (Minnesota) - Amtrak No. 7 St. Paul, MI to Columbus WI and the westbound Amtrak. No. 8 between Columbus, WI and St. Paul, MN hosts NPS staff Monday through Thursday.
 Ran by Mississippi National River and Recreation Area staff.
 Empire Builder (Washington) - Westbound Amtrak No. 8 Seattle, WA to Wenatchee, WA hosts NPS staff Thursdays and Sundays, while the Eastbound Amtrak No. 7 hosts staff Fridays and Mondays between Wenatchee, WA and Seattle, WA.
 Ran by staff from Klondike Gold Rush National Historical Park.
 Heartland Flyer - Amtrak No. 821 from Oklahoma City, OK to Fort Worth, TX and Fort Worth, TX to Oklahoma City, OK aboard Amtrak No. 822 host NPS staff Fridays and Saturdays.
 Ran by Oklahoma City National Memorial staff.
 Lincoln Service - Amtrak No. 302 between Springfield, IL and Chicago, IL hosts NPS staff Saturday and Sunday from May to November, and daily during summer months.
 Ran by staff from Lincoln Home National Historic Site. 
 Lincoln Service - Amtrak No. 303 between Springfield, IL and St. Louis, MO hosts NPS staff daily during the summer, and Saturdays and Sunday during September and October.
 Ran by Gateway Arch National Park staff.
Northeast Regional -  Washington, DC to New York City aboard trains 152/164 and New York City to Washington, DC aboard trains 161/87
Ran by staff from National Mall and Memorial Parks.
Pacific Surfliner (Santa Barbara) - Amtrak No. 763 between Santa Barbara, CA and San Luis Obispo, CA and Amtrak No. 796 from San Luis Obispo, CA to Santa Barbara, CA on Fridays, Saturdays, and Sundays hosts NPS staff.
Ran by Juan Bautista de Anza National Historical Trail staff.
Pacific Surfliner (LA - Amtrak No. 769 between San Diego, CA and Los Angeles, CA and Amtrak No. 580 between Los Angeles, CA and San Diego, CA hosts NPS staff on Saturdays.
Ran by staff from Cabrillo National Monument.
Southewest Chief - Amtrak No. 3 from La Junta, CO to Las Vegas, NM and Amtrak No. 4 between Las Vegas, NM and La Junta, CO hosts NPS staff Saturdays and Sundays.
Ran by Bent's Old Fort National Historic Site staff.
Texas Chief - Amtrak No. 21 between Chicago, IL and Springfield, IL hosts NPS staff Saturday and Sunday from May to November, and daily during summer months.
 Ran by staff from Lincoln Home National Historic Site. 
Texas Chief - Amtrak No. 22 between St. Louis, MO and Springfield, IL hosts NPS staff daily during the summer, and Saturdays and Sunday during September and October.
Ran by Gateway Arch National Monument staff.
Wolverine - Amtrak No. 350 between Niles, MI and Chicago, IL hosts NPS staff Wednesdays and Sundays, and the last Tuesday of every month.
Ran by staff from Indiana Dunes National Park.

History 
The idea behind Trails & Rails first formed from an Amtrak marketing director who was on board the Sunset Limited and overheard a National Park Service Ranger talking with passengers about the sites outside the window of the Sightseer Lounge. That Ranger, James Miculka, served as Chief of Interpretation at Jean Lafitte National Historical Park and Preserve in New Orleans, and started the program with staff from the park aboard the Sunset Limited and soon the City of New Orleans.  Trails & Rails officially became a nationwide program in 2000 when an agreement was signed between the National Park Service and Amtrak. Since then, the program has expanded to nearly two dozen routes under the leadership of National Coordinator Jim Miculka.  Around 2007, NPS began a partnership with the Department of Recreation, Park, and Tourism Sciences (RPTS) at Texas A&M University to house the management of the program there. RPTS faculty assists in training the new Volunteers-In-Parks (VIPs) who work on the program, as well as providing logistical and technical support to the program. RPTS faculty member Susan Scott serves as the Trails & Rails liaison, and coordinates training and support for the program.

Internships 
Due to the unique relationship between the National Park Service and Texas A&M's Department of Recreation, Park, and Tourism Sciences, students of RPTS are able to support the program through their studies, gaining hands on experiences. Host Parks in other cities around the nation also seek interns from local universities to volunteer aboard the routes in their area. The National Parks of New York Harbor have recruited students from local universities like St. John's to intern with the unit, and gain experiences volunteering aboard the Adirondack, in addition to their work at the parks.

References

External links
 

National Park Service
Amtrak
National Trails of the United States